Hillside Engineering Group is a trading division of the rail operator KiwiRail in Dunedin, New Zealand. Most of its work is related to KiwiRail, but it also does work for the marine industry in Dunedin. On 19 April 2012 KiwiRail announced it was putting Hillside on the market for sale. In November 2012 KiwiRail announced it had sold part of the business to Australian firm Bradken, and the rest would be closed. The workshops continued to be used for some maintenance work by Kiwirail with a skeleton staff. In October 2019, the New Zealand Government announced that it would be investing NZ$20 million into revitalising Hillside Engineering as a major mechanical hub and engineering facility to service Kiwi Rail's locomotives and rollingstock.

History

Hillside was founded as the Hillside Workshops of the New Zealand Railways Department in 1901, though workshops had existed close to the current site in South Dunedin since 1875. The workshops were extensively enlarged in the late 1920s, and by 1935 employed 800 workers, compared with 365 workers in 1925. At that stage they were the largest railway workshops in the South Island, covering . By 1945 staff numbers had been reduced to 550.

The workshops, in Hillside Road, were one of South Dunedin's biggest employers and most imposing structures. One of the ends of the nearby Carisbrook sports ground - demolished in 2012 - was known as "The Hillside End" or "The Workshops End" due to the presence of the former stadium's larger neighbour.

Passenger Car Projects
During 2003 Hillside won the contract to refurbish several old retired Queensland Rail SX cars, that were purchased from the Zig Zag Railway in Australia. The project lasted 14 weeks, after which the refurbished cars were sent to Auckland, where they are used on commuter trains, with a DBR diesel locomotive at each end.

In 2004, Hillside started work on rebuilding imported British Rail Mark 2 passenger cars for use in Auckland on commuter trains. The cars were stripped and rebuilt, for use in a push-pull consist, with a cab control car at one end (classed SD), with several standard cars (classed SA) in between and a diesel locomotive providing motive power at the other end (either a DC or DFT). A diesel generator which provides on board electrical power is fitted into a noise insulated compartment in each SD car. The SA/SD rebuilding project ended in 2010.

In 2009 KiwiRail announced that Hillside Engineering had won the contract to build 17 new passenger cars for its two South Island long distance passenger trains, the TranzAlpine and the Coastal Pacific, classed AK. Part of the project also includes converting 6 existing AG vans into 2 open-air viewing vans and 4 luggage vans. In November 2011, the new cars entered service on the Coastal Pacific.

Sale and closure
In November 2012 KiwiRail announced it had sold part of the business to Australian firm Bradken, and the rest would be closed. Ninety jobs were lost. The opposition Labour Party said the sale was a "political decision", but KiwiRail said there wasn't enough work to keep the workshop operating. Hillside had earlier lost a contract to build new wagons for KiwiRail after it was revealed that it was not competitive and would not be able to deliver the wagons within the time frame specified. KiwiRail said they intended to allocate some work to the new owners, while other work was to be done at the company's Hutt workshops near Wellington.

2019 Upgrade and re-opening
In the intervening years, Hillside Engineering's workshops continued to be used for some locomotive and wagon maintenance work by KiwiRail with a skeleton staff for overflow work from the KiwiRail Hutt Railway Workshops and maintenance and conversion work on South Island rolling stock. On 30 October 2019, Regional Development Minister Shane Jones announced that the Government would be investing $20 million into re-establishing Hillside workshop as a mechanical hub and heavy engineering facility to service KiwiRail's locomotives and rolling stock. This investment involves upgrading the two main workshop buildings and overhauling the mechanical plant.

On 20 May 2021, State Owned Enterprises Minister David Clark confirmed that Hillside Engineering would receive NZ$85 million for new facilities to assemble about 1,500 wagons as part of the 2021 New Zealand budget. Transport Minister Michael Wood also stated that about 445 jobs would be created between Hillside and a new South Island Mechanical Maintenance Hub based in Christchurch. The Hillside investment would also support 150 construction jobs and 45 operational KiwiRail jobs including apprenticeships. To promote the refurbishment of Hillside and the 2021 budget, Prime Minister Jacinda Ardern, Deputy Prime Minister Grant Robertson, and Dunedin MPs David Clark and Ingrid Leary visited the factory on 25 May 2021. The opposition ACT Party and the New Zealand Taxpayers' Union claimed the Hillside investment was wasteful, likening the Government's actions to Communist policies in North Korea and Poland. In response to criticism, Railways and Maritime Union national secretary Wayne Butson contended that the Hillside redevelopment project would benefit both the Otago region and New Zealand.

In early January 2022, the ACT Party obtained documents under the Official Information Act 1982 showing that KiwiRail officials had expressed concerns about the Government's NZ$85 million budget allocation to reopen the Hillside workshop in Dunedin; estimating that it would cost between NZ$305 and 400 million to properly equip the factory. KiwiRail had recommended allocating NZ$771 million from the budget for the National Land Transport Fund to be spent on rail, NZ$197.9 million in capital for resilience and a further $1.27billion for new rolling stock and mechanical depots. The Government had reduced these bids by about NZ$800million. In addition, KiwiRail estimated that it would have to import 780 wagons during the two year period when Hillside Engineering was being rebuilt. While the ACT Party's transport spokesperson Simon Court claimed the Hillside project was unsound and based on political expediency, Transport Minister Wood and State Owned Enterprises Minister Clark claimed that the Hillside factory would bring good, high-paying engineering jobs back to Dunedin after the previous National Government shut it down.

Locomotives classes built at Hillside

Many locomotive classes were built at Hillside:

 DSC
 C (1930) (12)
 JA (35)
 KB (6) 
 L
 WA (6)
 WAB (20)
 WF (16)
 WG (20)
 WW (48)
 TR (9) (1973–78, Diesel shunters)

Hillside also rebuilt the following locomotive classes:
 DG (10)
 G (1928) (6)
 WE (3)
 X (1)

See also
New Zealand British Rail Mark 2 carriage, rebuilt at Hillside Workshops and Hutt Workshops from British Railways Mark 2 carriages
NZR Addington Workshops, Christchurch
NZR Hutt Workshops, Lower Hutt/Wellington  
NZR Newmarket Workshops Auckland then Otahuhu Workshops, Auckland
New Zealand Railways Department

References

Further reading

External links
 Toll NZ
 Photo of Spot Welder at Hillside Workshops c1927

Buildings and structures in Dunedin
Companies based in Dunedin
Rail transport in Dunedin
Railway workshops in New Zealand
Transport buildings and structures in Otago